Allegheny West is a historic neighborhood in Pittsburgh, Pennsylvania's North Side. The Pittsburgh Historic Review Commission voted in favor of designating the neighborhood as a city historic district in September 1989.

The neighborhood has two zip codes of both 15233 and 15212, and has representation on Pittsburgh City Council by the council member for District 1 (North Side).

History
The area was frequented by Native Americans until late in the 18th century. In 1787 David Redick began a survey of the area, with land to be given to Continental soldiers as part of their pay for service in the American Revolution. In 1788 lots in the area were auctioned off in Philadelphia. Houses were first built in the district in 1846-47 and streets were laid out about the same time. In the 1860s there was another boom in housing construction.

In the late 19th century Ridge Avenue became known as "Millionaire's Row" with mansions built for Henry W. Oliver, William Penn Snyder, Harmar Denny, Alexander M. Byers, and others. Lincoln Avenue also became known for its mansions.

The neighborhood is the birthplace of Gertrude Stein.

Gallery

Surrounding Pittsburgh neighborhoods
Allegheny Center 
Central Northside 
Chateau 
Manchester 
North Shore

See also
 List of Pittsburgh neighborhoods

References

External links
Allegheny West Civic Council
Allegheny West Neighborhood

Neighborhoods in Pittsburgh
National Register of Historic Places in Pittsburgh
Pittsburgh History & Landmarks Foundation Historic Landmarks
City of Pittsburgh historic designations
Historic districts on the National Register of Historic Places in Pennsylvania